The Act Respecting the Oath to the Succession (26 Hen. 8 c. 2) was passed by the Parliament of England in November 1534, and required all subjects to take an oath to uphold the Act of Succession passed that March. It was later given the formal short title of the Succession to the Crown Act 1534.

Provisions
The Act required all those asked to take the oath to recognise Anne Boleyn as King Henry VIII's lawful wife and their children legitimate heirs to the throne. Anyone refusing to take the oath was guilty of treason.

The Oath of Succession itself went further than the original Act in several ways. It demanded that persons swearing the oath renounce the power of any "foreign authority or potentate" and repudiate any oath previously made to such an authority. This discrepancy did not go unnoticed by Sir Thomas More who claimed he had been sent to the Tower "for refusing of this oath not agreeable with the statute". He thought that Thomas Cromwell and Thomas Audley "did of their own heads add more words unto it" and therefore they were unable "by their own law ... to justify my imprisonment".

Refusal to take the oath led to the arrests of Sir Thomas More, Bishop John Fisher and John Houghton, O.Cart. under the Treasons Act 1534. They refused to take the oath because it included the abjuration of the pope and claimed the marriage between King Henry VIII and Catherine of Aragon was annulled and it went against their Catholic beliefs. More, Fisher and Houghton were beheaded in 1535.

See also 
 Succession to the British throne
 Alternative successions of the English and British crown

References

English Reformation
1534 in law
1534 in England
Acts of the Parliament of England (1485–1603)
Oaths
Anne Boleyn